The 1996 Malta Masters was a non-ranking invitational snooker tournament which took place in May 1996. The tournament was held at the Jerma Palace Hotel in Marsaskala, and featured twelve professional players, alongside four amateurs - Malta's Tony Brincat, Jason Pelow and Kevin d'Agostino, and Amnuayporn Chotipong of Thailand.

Mark Davis won the event, beating John Read 6–3 in the final.

Main draw

References

Snooker in Malta
1996 in snooker
1996 in Maltese sport